Karl Ludvig "Kalle" Reichelt (28 November 1933 – 29 October 2016) was a Norwegian medical researcher. He was best known for his research on the opioid peptides in casein and gluten. He also did important work on cancer.

In 1972, he delivered his PhD thesis at the University of Oslo:

“An investigation into the nature and function of anionic acids, peptides, and acid-soluble proteins from brain tissue”.

The voluntary association Mat og Atferd (in English Food & Behaviour) is established in Norway on the basis of Reichelt´s work. 

He worked daily at Rikshospitalet, Norwegian for the National Hospital, in Oslo, Norway, until medio 2012 as a senior researcher and advisor.

Karl Ludvig Reichelt received HM The King's Medal of Merit in gold in 2004.

Works 
Collected Net Articles of Kalle Reichelt, M.D

Reichelt, K. L. (1972). An investigation into the nature and function of anionic acids, peptides, and acid-soluble proteins from brain tissue(BIBSYS - Norwegian National University Library System, www.unit.no).

1933 births
Norwegian medical researchers
2016 deaths
Recipients of the King's Medal of Merit in gold